Joel W. Thorne (16 October 1914 New York City – 17 October 1955 North Hollywood, California) was an American racecar driver, engineer, and playboy. He died when he crashed his private plane, after what witnesses described as "stunting", into an apartment building, killing three residents including a two-month-old baby. Thorne raced his own cars is the Indianapolis 500, and later went on to attempt to design aircraft.

The 1946 Indianapolis 500 was won by a car built by Thorne and driven by George Robson. One of Thorne's cars also won the pole position and finished second in the 1939 Indianapolis 500 with Jimmy Snyder behind the wheel.

Indianapolis 500 results

See also
Frank Kurtis
Davis Motorcar Company
Davis Divan

References

External links

1914 births
1955 deaths
Indianapolis 500 drivers
Victims of aviation accidents or incidents in the United States
Accidental deaths in California
Racing drivers from New York City
AAA Championship Car drivers